Philippe Jean Lopes-Curval (9 June 1951 – 13 February 2023) was a French film director and screenwriter.

Biography
Born in Bayeux on 9 June 1951, Lopes-Curval directed a series of short films before directing his first feature film, Trop tard Balthazar, in 1986. Released on Canal+, the film was noticed by Jean-Claude Fleury, who introduced him to Gérard Jugnot. He also wrote the screenplay for the Christophe Barratier film The Chorus.

In 2017, Lopes-Curval co-signed the booklet for the musical festival at the Folies Bergère. In 2011, he wrote a comic book, Les Grobec.

Lopes-Curval was the father of fellow film director Julie Lopes-Curval and married to painter Catherine Lopes-Curval. He died in Bayeux on 13 February 2023, at the age of 71.

Screenplays
Trop tard Balthazar (1986)
Le Parisien (1989)
Une époque formidable... (1991)
Casque bleu (1994)
Fallait pas !... (1996)
La Mostra (1998)
Jo, l'Irlandaise (2000)
Monsieur Batignole  (2002)
The Chorus (2004)
Boudu (2005)
Fashion Victim (2008)
Dans tes rêves (2010)
La Montre du Président (2010)
War of the Buttons (2011)
Vintage (2014)
L'École de la liberté (2022)

Films directed
Le Drapeau tricolore (1982)
À pic (1982)
Rohner peintre (1983)
Trop tard Balthazar (1986)
Baby comme back (1987)
Côté cour, côté jardin (1995)

References

External links

1951 births
2023 deaths
French film directors
French screenwriters
People from Bayeux